"I Have But One Heart" is a popular song composed by Johnny Farrow, with lyrics by Marty Symes.  The song was published in 1945.

Background
The song is adapted from the traditional Neapolitan song "O Marenariello."

1947 recordings
A recording by Vic Damone, his first release, reached #7 on the Billboard chart in 1947 and the recording by Frank Sinatra also charted, reaching the No. 13 position.

Other recordings
The song has been recorded by others such as:
Sergio Franchi used this song, both alone and in a medley with Speak Softly Love from The Godfather. His recorded versions appear on such albums as 20 Magnificent Songs (DynaHouse, 1976), and From My Private Collection - Con Amore (Gold Records, 1976).
Dean Martin 
Jerry Vale
Joni James
Connie Francis
It was recorded in 2008 by Australian singer Alfio for his album Classic Rewinds which pays tribute to Vic Damone, Al Martino and 13 other popular Italian-American singers.

Popular culture
The song was sung by the character Johnny Fontane played by Al Martino in the film, The Godfather, during  Connie's wedding, and was on the soundtrack album to the film.
The song as recorded by Al Martino is played in the background of The Batman in the scene when Bruce Wayne confronts mobster Carmine Falcone

References

1945 songs
Songs with lyrics by Marty Symes
Vic Damone songs
The Godfather music